Podlipa is a village in a small valley northwest of Vrhnika in the Inner Carniola region of Slovenia. In addition to the hamlet of Dolino in the main part of the settlement, in includes the hamlets of Krošljev Hrib, Trčkov Hrib, Železnikov Hrib, and Podpesek.

Church

The parish church in the settlement is dedicated to Saint Bricius and belongs to the Ljubljana Archdiocese.

Notable people
Notable people that were born or lived in Podlipa include:
Marija Brenčič-Jelen (1919–2000), poet
Peter Hitzinger (1812–1867), historian

References

External links

Podlipa on Geopedia

Populated places in the Municipality of Vrhnika